Doris Arlene Bohrer (5 February 1923 – 8 August 2016) was an American intelligence operative who started her career during World War II with the Office of Strategic Services and was later deputy head of counterintelligence for the Central Intelligence Agency.

References 

1923 births
2016 deaths
People of the Central Intelligence Agency
People from Wyoming
American real estate brokers